Shanakhdakheto or Shanakdakhete was a Queen of the Kingdom of Kush, when the polity was centered at Meroë, an ancient city in north Sudan. She is the earliest known ruling African queen of ancient Nubia, and reigned from c. 170–150 BC, although the period 170–160 BC is also mentioned. She is said to have ruled with absolute power in the Meroë Empire. She is also said to have ruled without a king. It is also stated that as queen she played a significant role in the Meroitic religion. In the 2nd century BC, Shanakdakheto built the Temple F at Naqa, which has an unusual feature in the first half of the temple with the interior partitions where the gods face the back wall.

Overview

Shanakdakheto's name is inscribed as a royal queen in the Egyptian Meroitic hieroglyphs. This inscription is the one seen on the doorjambs of the altar niche of Temple F in Naqa. Shanakdakheto styled herself as: Son of Re, Lord of the Two Lands, Shanakdakheto (Sa Re nebtawy, Shanakdakheto). The inscription reads:

Meroites scripted their own language in the early part of the second century BC (alphabetical script during the reign of Ergamenes), the language is still not fully deciphered) and its first epigraphic inscription is said to be of Queen Shannakdahane in the Temple F at Naqa.

Even though her family antecedents remain obscure, in one of her carvings on a dorsal pillar she is shown adorned with an insignia of rank on the forehead and a crown, similar to the one worn by the reigning kings with the decoration of a sun-disk and tall feathers. The garment decorating her, similar to that seen in Pharaonic art, like Uraeus, is drawn as a three-part royal costume. The necklace and her earrings have decoration of a goat head, a sacred animal of the god Amun used in Kushite decorative tradition which was popular in Nubia. The prince standing next to her, wearing a tunic draped around the left shoulder, is shown with an ordinary band as a crown. The two figures are shown with their left foot forward. As an African beauty, the queen is shown with a strong build, and bejeweled, a trait indicating wealth, power and prosperity, and childbearing capacity.

In the decorations of her mortuary chapel, the architectural features are highly artistic. In one sunken relief the queen is depicted wearing an embellished garment and bejeweled, sitting on a royal seat shaped as a lion, carrying a spear and palm branch in her right, with her left hand raised.

A double cartouche found in Naqa is dated to a later part of the second century BC which is said to be the earliest epigraph in Meroitic Hieroglyphs. However, the hieroglyphic cursive on the Queen's cartouche is called "classical" in style, not seen on the Jebel Barkal slab of Tanyidamani's cartouche who was considered  Shanakdakhete's successor. Her pyramid was identified at Meroë, next to Tanyidamani's but not established as her name is not preserved. In the tomb chapel reliefs of Queen Shanakdakhete the carvings show men holding arrows as a Meroitic burial custom. In the sandstone relief stele (pictured) displayed at the British Museum which is the part of the wall of the steep-sided pyramids of the cemetery at Meroe, it is believed that Queen Shanakdakhete is shown enthroned with a prince standing next to her under the protection of Isis with wings. Scenes of religious offerings, the queen's evaluation in front of Osiris, and a number of bearers lined in the front carrying gifts are depicted in the reliefs.

References

Bibliography

Further reading
 Laszlo Török, in: Fontes Historiae Nubiorum, Vol. II, Bergen 1996, 660–662

External links

2nd-century BC monarchs of Kush
2nd-century BC women rulers
Ancient queens regnant
Year of birth unknown
Year of death unknown
2nd-century BC rulers in Africa
Queens of Kush